Sister Maria Elena Berini (born 9 December 1944 Sondrio, Italy) is a Catholic nun, and mission worker.
She won an International Women of Courage Award in 2018.

Life 
She entered the novitiate of the Sisters of Jeanne-Antide Thouret.

From 1963 to 1969, she trained as a teacher. 
In 1972, she went to Chad, to work in rural schools.
In 2007, her congregation sent her to the Central African Republic. 
In 2017, she provided refuge at her Catholic mission, when rebels attacked Bocaranga.

References

External links 
 
 
 

 Biographies of the Finalists for the 2018 International Women of Courage Awards

Living people
1944 births
20th-century Italian Roman Catholic religious sisters and nuns
People from Sondrio
Italian Roman Catholic missionaries
Recipients of the International Women of Courage Award
21st-century Italian Roman Catholic religious sisters and nuns